Stough can be an anglicization of the German/Swiss surname Stauch.

People
 B. D. Stough, zoologist (Troglostrongylus wilsoni)
 Bessie Callender (née Stough), American sculptress
 Carl Stough (1926–2000), American choral conductor
 Charley Stough III, American journalist, former employee of the Dayton Daily News
 Charlotte L. Stough, American philosopher/educator/administrator/psychologist, former intelligence officer with the Central Intelligence Agency
 Con Stough, Australian neuroscientist
 Craig Stough, American politician (mayor of Sylvania, Ohio)
 Dale P. Stough, American historian
 Dowling Stough, American dermatologist
 Durden Stough, American author
 Eric Stough, American animation director/producer
 Erin Stough, American contributor at LaughingPlace.com
 Furman Charles "Bill" Stough, American clergyman, Bishop of the Episcopal Diocese of Alabama
 Glen Stough, American football player, a 27th-round draft pick in 1945 for the Pittsburgh Steelers
 H. Paul Stough III, American aviation engineer
 Israel Stough, American military officer, leader of the 153rd Ohio Infantry, commanded a Union regiment at the Battle of Folck's Mill and the Battle of Old Town
 John Stough, American clergyman, one of the original settlers of Aurora, West Virginia
 Jonas Stough, American miner, co-founder of the Atlantic Cable Quartz Lode
 Joshua Stough, American computer scientist and professor at Bucknell University
 Laura M. Stough, author
 Roger R. Stough, American economist, co-author of Public Policy in an Entrepreneurial Economy: Creating the Conditions for Business Growth with Zoltan Acs, co-author of New Directions in Regional Economic Development: The Role of Entrepreneurship Theory and Methods, Practice and Policy with Sameeksha Desai and Peter Nijkamp
 S. Stough, neuroscientist
 Steven Stough, American, a plaintiff in Kitzmiller v. Dover Area School District
 Zac Stough, American musician, former vocalist of Urban Waste

Places and geographical features
 Stough Canyon, Burbank, California
 Stough Cemetery, Thorncreek Township, Whitley County, Indiana
 Stough Creek Basin (contains Stough Creek Basin Trail, one of the trails in Fremont County, Wyoming)
 Stough Elementary School, Raleigh, North Carolina
 Stough Memorial Baptist Church, Pineville, North Carolina
 Stough Street, Hinsdale, Illinois (site of West Hinsdale (Metra station))
 Stough-Beckett Cottage, Historic Landmark #146 in San Diego, California

References

Germanic-language surnames
English-language surnames
Lists of people by surname